Ghostfish or Ghost Fish may refer to:

Animals

Called “ghostfish” or “ghost fish”
Predatory tunicate, which is not actually a fish
Wrymouth
Kryptopterus vitreolus

called similar names
Chimaera, also known as a ghost shark
Black ghost knifefish

Other
The 16th episode of season 2 of  My Goldfish Is Evil
The codename for watchOS 3.2.3
Ghostfish: Catfished By A Ghost , a film from the 2016 48Hours competition

Similar terms
Ghost nets and other “ghost fishing gear”
Ghost Fishing: An Eco-Justice Poetry Anthology